Guam competed at the 2015 Pacific Games in Port Moresby, Papua New Guinea from 4 to 18 July 2015. Guam listed 148 competitors as of 4 July 2015.

Athletics

Guam qualified one athlete in track and field:

Men
 Justin Michael Barcinas Andre

Basketball

Guam qualified men's and women's teams in basketball (28 athletes):

Women
 Kali Lauren Benavente
 Brianna Veronica Calvo Benito
 Charrisse Rose Aquino Bolabola
 Alina Flores Bonto
 Destiny Rae Castro
 Kathryn Krystle Castro
 Joylyn Ollet Pangilinan
 April Pardilla
 Crystal Pardilla
 Emily Pardilla
 Jocelyn Labordo Pardilla
 Maree Rose Cruz Pelkey
 Sonja Maria Sanchez
 Derin Joy Santos

Men

The gold medal-winning squad at the 2015 Pacific Games:

Beach volleyball

Guam qualified men's and women's teams in beach volleyball (7 athletes):

Women
 Kendra Celena Byrd
 Kara Nichole Guerrero
 Tatiana Afalava Sablan

Men
 Ookkrit (Jimmy) Boonprakong
 Ryan Kevin V. Eugenio
 Shintaro Okada
 Christopher Lee Shepherd

Boxing

Guam qualified 2 athletes in boxing:

Women
 Gianna Sarusal

Men
 Adrienne Laurence Panlilio Francisco

Football

Golf

Guam qualified 7 athletes in golf:

Women
 Teresita Manabo Blair
 Emiri Satake
 Kalina Mia Satake

Men
 Bruce Arizobal Estrada III
 Jimmy Lawrence Duenas Mafnas
 John Anthony Blas Muna
 Louie Jose Sunga

Outrigger canoeing

Guam qualified 26 athletes in va'a:

Women
 Analisa Santos Almazan
 Kamaka Moylan Alston
 Maribeth Balidio Benavente
 Rosemarie Bell Camacho
 Liana Lynn Galvez Delos Trinos
 Francine Nicole Galao
 Elizabeth Dupuluar Lubuag
 Odessa Maureen Martinez
 Beatrice Delin Sahagon Mata
 Nicole Marie Murphy
 Patrina Ann Perez
 Thelma Reyes Soriano

Men
 Carl Joseph Aguon Jr.
 Jonathan Paul Buasuwan
 Christian Anne Jimena Carreon
 Bonn Bryan Apelo Delos Trinos
 Brandon Joseph Delgado Hernandez
 Ian Roque Perez Iriarte
 Eric John Mendiola
 Thomas Carl Johnson Mendiola
 Adam James Cariaso Palomo
 Johnny Cariaso Palomo
 Michael Steven Pangelinan Jr.
 Michael Steven Pangelinan
 Arthur Thomas Tedtaotao Taimanglo
 Richard Eugene Valentine III

Rugby sevens

Guam qualified a men's rugby sevens team (13 players)
Men
 Gerard Joseph Aguon
 Johnny Benjamin Quitigua Borja
 Edward Gerard Sonido Calvo
 Vinson Calvo
 Paul Anthony Eustaquio
 Robert James Leon Guerrero
 Jesse Fontino Andrew Perez
 Sixto Aguon Quintanilla III
 Brian Kevin Murphy Ramiro
 Ezra Brown Sablan
 Christopher Peter Sgro
 Matthew Eduardo Sgro
 Christopher Ryan Blaz Wintterle

Shooting

Guam qualified 10 athletes in shooting:

Women
 Erika Takahashi Camacho
 Maria Teresa B Cenzon-Duenas
 Hope Florice Marie Delos Reyes
 Amalia Concepcion Cenzon Duenas  – 10 m air pistol female. 
 Daena Joan Taitague Mansapit

Men
 Ricardo Jose Duenas
 Adrian Tano Mora
 Louis John Paulino
 Richard Daniel Paulino Jr
 Valentino Gregg Perez

Swimming

Guam qualified 8 athletes in swimming:

Women
 Mineri Kurotori Gomez
 Amanda Joy Poppe
 Pilar Celina Taitano Shimizu

Men
 Christopher Jude Mesa Duenas
 Tommy Joe Imazu
 Tanner Joel Poppe
 Benjamin Anthony Aguon Schulte
 Jagger Kealohilani Cruz Stephens

Taekwondo

Guam qualified 3 athletes in taekwondo:

Women
 Amber Elizabeth Garrido Toves

Men
 Alexander Xavier Gaces Allen
 Joseph Jinbum Chargualaf Ho

Tennis

Guam qualified 4 athletes in tennis:

Women
 Charlayne Labra Espinosa
 Camdyn Letah Nadler

Men
 Joshua Joseph P Cepeda
 Andrew Chung

Triathlon

Guam qualified 7 athletes in triathlon

Women
 Genina Georgette Piolo Criss
 Mylene Garcia Garcia
 Karly Jael O'Neal
 Ayshalynn Almogela Perez

Men
 Patrick Bernard Aflague Camacho
 Peter Noble Lombard II
 James Cameron O'Neal

Volleyball

Guam qualified men's and women's teams in volleyball (23 athletes):

Women
 Demie Rose Williams Brennan
 Leah Marie Jastillana Castro
 Adriana Sorah Chang
 Kyra Lilia Emiko Lee
 Dawn Kuunani Makio
 Mya Jade Certeza Sanchez
 Sheri n/a Stanley
 Muneka Joy Cruz Taisipic
 Joneen Veronica Hernandez Terlaje
 Jasie Elise Villanueva
 Maria Kamalin Aquiningoc Wahl
 Erin Marie Wong

Men
 Eric Mikel Palacios Ada
 Brian Attao Balajadia
 Teleforo Jerry Baza Balajadia Jr.
 Robert Mcmurray Borden
 Misaki Paul Cramer
 Kenneth William Brennan Leon Guerrero
 Jude Vincent Lizama
 Devin Douglas Maluwelmeng
 Luis Crisostomo Mesngon Jr.
 Nathaniel Justin Sanchez San Nicolas
 Derrick Charles Aquiningoc Wahl

Weightlifting

Guam qualified 9 athletes in weightlifting:

Women
 Krystal Monique Tedtaotao Madden
 Amy Marie Reyes
 Kayla Sonido Taguacta
 Kimberly Sonido Taguacta

Men
 Zachary Joseph Bonanno
 Paul Patrick Mendiola Claros
 Shane Alan Concepcion
 Brandon James Holm
 Krysthian Marr Jeffersonne G Villanueva

References

2015 in Guamanian sports
Nations at the 2015 Pacific Games
Guam at the Pacific Games